Defaka may refer to:
the Defaka people
the Defaka language